The 38th parallel south is a circle of latitude that is 38 degrees south of the Earth's equatorial plane. It crosses the Atlantic Ocean, the Indian Ocean, Australia, New Zealand, the Pacific Ocean, and South America, including the Andes Mountains and Patagonia.

At this latitude the sun is visible for 14 hours, 48 minutes during the December solstice and 9 hours, 32 minutes during the June solstice.

Around the world
Starting at the Prime Meridian and heading eastwards, the parallel 38° south passes through:

{| class="wikitable plainrowheaders"
! scope="col" width="125" | Co-ordinates
! scope="col" | Country, territory or ocean
! scope="col" | Notes
|-
| style="background:#b0e0e6;" | 
! scope="row" style="background:#b0e0e6;" | Atlantic Ocean 
| style="background:#b0e0e6;" |
|-
| style="background:#b0e0e6;" | 
! scope="row" style="background:#b0e0e6;" | Indian Ocean
| style="background:#b0e0e6;" | Passing just south of Île Amsterdam, 
|-valign="top"
| 
! scope="row" | 
| South Australia Victoria - passing through Port Phillip Bay and southeastern Melbourne
|-
| style="background:#b0e0e6;" | 
! scope="row" style="background:#b0e0e6;" | Pacific Ocean
| style="background:#b0e0e6;" | Tasman Sea
|-
| 
! scope="row" | 
| North Island - passing 2.4 km south of Whakatane
|-
| style="background:#b0e0e6;" | 
! scope="row" style="background:#b0e0e6;" | Pacific Ocean
| style="background:#b0e0e6;" |
|-valign="top"
| 
! scope="row" | 
| Bío Bío Region Araucanía Region Bío Bío Region
|-
| 
! scope="row" | 
|Neuquén ProvinceRío Negro ProvinceLa Pampa ProvinceBuenos Aires Province – passing through Mar del Plata (at )
|-
| style="background:#b0e0e6;" | 
! scope="row" style="background:#b0e0e6;" | Atlantic Ocean
| style="background:#b0e0e6;" |
|}

See also
37th parallel south
39th parallel south

s38